Restrictions on political parties have existed in many countries at various times. In Uganda, for instance, political parties were restricted in their activities from 1986; in the non-party "Movement" system instituted by President Yoweri Museveni, political parties continued to exist but could not campaign in elections or field candidates directly (although electoral candidates could belong to political parties). A constitutional referendum cancelled this 19-year ban on multi-party politics in July 2005.

Egypt has been criticized for restricting political party activity. In Europe; Germany, Italy, Turkey, and France have laws allowing the government to ban extremist groups, especially far-right and/or neo-nazi organizations.

See also 
 Political repression

References

External links
Guidelines on prohibition and dissolution of political parties and analogous measures Venice Commission, 1999
Opinion on the constitutional and legal provisions relevant to the prohibition of political parties in Turkey Venice Commission, 2009
Restrictions on political parties in the Council of Europe member states Parliamentary Assembly of the Council of Europe, 2002

Political parties
Political repression